Ortanca can refer to:

 Ortanca, Akçakoca
 Ortanca, Kahta